Winza is a mining location in Mpwapwa District, Dodoma Region, Tanzania, Africa.
It is known for ruby mining.

The Winza mines are in the Usagaran Belt which is a metamorphic zone. Rubies were discovered in the area in 2007.

References

Dodoma Region
http://gemresearch.ch/project-details/winza-ruby-magnificent/